Arty  was a Nubian King's wife dated to the Twenty-fifth Dynasty of Egypt.

Arty was a daughter of King Piye and was the wife of Shebitku. She is known from Cairo Statue 49157 from Karnak. Her name is mentioned on the base of a statue of Haremakhet.

She was buried in the necropolis at El-Kurru, in tomb Ku.6.

References

8th-century BC Egyptian women
7th-century BC Egyptian women
Queens consort of the Twenty-fifth Dynasty of Egypt
Princesses of the Twenty-fifth Dynasty of Egypt
Ancient Egyptian priestesses
8th-century BC clergy
7th-century BC clergy
8th-century BC Egyptian people
7th-century BC Egyptian people